Percnarcha strategica is a moth in the family Gelechiidae. It was described by Edward Meyrick in 1930. It is found in Pará, Brazil.

References

Gelechiinae
Moths described in 1930